Jack Young (born 21 October 2000) is an English professional footballer who plays as a midfielder for Wycombe Wanderers.

Career
Born in Morpeth, Northumberland, Young began his career at Newcastle United at the age of 7, before turning professional in 2019. He moved on loan to Tranmere Rovers in October 2020. After making five appearances, Young returned to Newcastle. He moved on loan to Wycombe Wanderers in January 2022, but after just 2 league appearances was close to being recalled by Newcastle in March 2022. However, he subsequently signed a three-year permanent deal with Wycombe in April 2022.

References

External links

2000 births
Living people
English footballers
Newcastle United F.C. players
Tranmere Rovers F.C. players
Wycombe Wanderers F.C. players
English Football League players
Association football midfielders